The 2011 Thai FA Cup Final was the 18th final of the Thailand's domestic football cup competition, the FA Cup. The final was played at Suphachalasai Stadium in Bangkok on 11 January 2012. The match was contested by Muangthong United, who beat Songkhla 6–5 (PSO.), (After Extra Time 2-2) in their semi-final, and Buriram PEA who beat Army United 2–0 in the match. The match was won by Buriram PEA, defeating Muangthong United 1–0 after extra time through a goal scored by Frank Acheampong.

Road to the final

Note: In all results below, the score of the finalist is given first (H: home; A: away; TPL: Clubs from Thai Premier League; D1: Clubs from Thai Division 1 League; D2: Clubs from Regional League Division 2).

Match

Details

Assistant referees:
 Binla Prida
 Nirut Rungsrichat
Fourth official:
 Teetichai Nualjan
MATCH RULES
90 minutes.
30 minutes of extra-time if necessary.
Penalty shootout if scores still level.
Nine named substitutes
Maximum of 3 substitutions.

1
2011